Philipp Wilhelm Grüneberg (1710 – 1777) was a German organ builder. He founded the important organ building family Grüneberg in Brandenburg and Stettin.

Life 
Born in Magdeburg, was possibly an associate of David Zuberbier, from whom he continued a work in Zerbst. From about 1752, Grüneberg was active in his hometown, where he was mentioned in 1760 as one of four organ builders. Around 1767, he went to Belgard in Pomerania, where he was also organist.

His son Johann Wilhelm Grüneberg became an organ builder in Brandenburg an der Havel, Georg Friedrich Grüneberg in Szczecin in Pomerania.

Works (selection) 
Two new buildings are known by Philipp Wilhelm Grüneberg, as well as some repairs and a mood offering, all of which are indicated. 

New organ buildings

Other works

Further reading 
 Philipp Wilhelm Grüneberg (1), in Uwe Pape, Wolfram Hackel, Christhard Kirchner (ed.): Lexikon norddeutscher Orgelbauer. Vol. 4. Berlin, Brandenburg und Umgebung. Pape Verlag, Berlin 2017. pp. 188f.

 

German pipe organ builders
1710 births
1777 deaths
Businesspeople from Magdeburg